Bajalta is a Village located, just 13 km from Jammu City in Jammu district in the union territory of the Jammu and Kashmir, India

References

Jammu and Kashmir